Manuguru Express is an express train in India that daily runs between Secunderabad, Telangana and Manuguru town in Bhadradri Kothagudem District of Telangana.

Stops of these train are Secunderabad, Janagaon, Kazipet, Warangal e.t.c.,

Manugur express timings are 23.45 from secunderabad

Transport in Secunderabad
Railway services introduced in 2011
Rail transport in Telangana